This is a discography chronicling the musical career of James Brown.  Brown joined Bobby Byrd's vocal group The Flames in 1953, first as a drummer, and then as leading front man. Later becoming The Famous Flames, they signed with Federal Records in 1956 and recorded their first hit single, "Please, Please, Please", which sold over a million copies. 

After the hit release of "Try Me", following nine relative failures, the group scored a series of hit albums and recordings in the early 1960s. Brown's solo aspirations started around 1962. By the time of "Papa's Got a Brand New Bag", he used the Flames less and less as he became a full-fledged solo artist who was now involved in the development of a new R&B subgenre, funk. Eventually the Famous Flames left him in 1968 as did his James Brown band by 1970 and Brown hired The J.B.'s who helped contribute to his continuing success in the 1970s. After their disbanding, Brown struggled for a number of years with recordings before the release of 1985's "Living in America", and having success with the albums Gravity (1986) and I'm Real (1988).

Brown charted at least 96 entries on the Billboard Hot 100 and at least 110 entries on the R&B chart. Seventeen of Brown's singles, including five credited as "James Brown and the Famous Flames", hit number-one on the R&B chart. He recorded several more hits pseudonymously, notably "(Do the) Mashed Potatoes" and "Doing It to Death". In addition to his own hits, Brown wrote and produced charting records by many other performers, including Bobby Byrd, Hank Ballard, Tammy Montgomery, Lyn Collins, Marva Whitney, and The J.B.'s. In contrast to his chart success, few of Brown's hit recordings were certified by the RIAA, partly due to the reluctance of his record labels to pay the required fees. He had just two certified gold singles - "Get on the Good Foot" (1972) and "The Payback" (1974) - and one gold album, 1973's The Payback. However, two 1991 compilations of his work earned RIAA certification: Star Time (gold) and 20 All-Time Greatest Hits! (platinum).

Albums

Studio albums

Compilation albums

Live albums

Singles discography
(Note) Listed below are the charting singles James Brown released on the King Records subsidiary Federal and King record labels, and Smash Records . Most of the songs also feature The Famous Flames on backing vocals through 1965. Brown had recorded singles for Bethlehem and Ember Records alternatively.

1956–1971
{|class="wikitable" style="text-align:center;"
!rowspan="2" style="width:2em;" | Year
!rowspan="2" style="width:25em;"| Titles (A-side, B-side)Both sides from same album except where indicated
!colspan="8"| Peak chart positions
!rowspan="2" style="width:10em;"| Certifications
!rowspan="2" style="width:20em;"| Album
|-
!style="width:2em;font-size:90%;"| US

!style="width:2em;font-size:90%;"| USR&B

!style="width:2em;font-size:90%;"| BEL

!style="width:2em;font-size:90%;"| CAN

!style="width:2em;font-size:90%;"| GER

!style="width:2em;font-size:90%;"| ITA

!style="width:2em;font-size:90%;"| NED

!style="width:2em;font-size:90%;"| UK
|-
| colspan="15" style="text-align:left;"| Federal releases:
|-
| rowspan="4"|1956
| style="text-align:left;"| "Please, Please, Please"b/w "Why Do You Do Me" (from Try Me!)
| —
| 6
| —
| —
| —
| —
| —
| —
|
| style="text-align:left;" rowspan="5"| Please Please Please
|-
| style="text-align:left;"| "I Don't Know"b/w "I Feel That Old Feeling Coming On" 
| —
| —
| —
| —
| —
| —
| —
| —
|
|-
| style="text-align:left;"| "No, No, No, No"b/w "Hold My Baby's Hand" 
| —
| —
| —
| —
| —
| —
| —
| —
|
|-
| style="text-align:left;"| "Chonnie-On-Chon"b/w "I Won't Plead No More" (from Try Me!)
| —
| —
| —
| —
| —
| —
| —
| —
|
|-
|rowspan="5"|1957
| style="text-align:left;"| "Just Won't Do Right"b/w "Let's Make It" 
| —
| —
| —
| —
| —
| —
| —
| —
|
|-
| style="text-align:left;"| "Gonna Try"b/w "Can't Be the Same" 
| —
| —
| —
| —
| —
| —
| —
| —
|
| style="text-align:left;" rowspan="3"| Try Me!
|-
| style="text-align:left;"| "Messing with the Blues"b/w "Love or a Game" (from Please, Please, Please)
| —
| —
| —
| —
| —
| —
| —
| —
|
|-
| style="text-align:left;"| "You're Mine, You're Mine"b/w "I Walked Alone" (from Please, Please, Please)
| —
| —
| —
| —
| —
| —
| —
| —
|
|-
| style="text-align:left;"| "That Dood It"b/w "Baby Cries Over the Ocean" 
| —
| —
| —
| —
| —
| —
| —
| —
|
| style="text-align:left;" rowspan="3"| Please, Please, Please
|-
| rowspan="2"|1958
| style="text-align:left;"| "Begging, Begging"b/w "That's When I Lost My Heart"
| —
| —
| —
| —
| —
| —
| —
| —
|
|-
| style="text-align:left;"| "Try Me"b/w "Tell Me What I Did Wrong"
| 48
| 1
| —
| —
| —
| —
| —
| —
|
|-
| rowspan="4"|1959
| style="text-align:left;"| "I Want You So Bad"b/w "There Must Be a Reason"
| —
| 20
| —
| —
| —
| —
| —
| —
|
| style="text-align:left;" rowspan="3"| Try Me!
|-
| style="text-align:left;"| "I've Got to Change"b/w "It Hurts to Tell You" 
| —
| —
| —
| —
| —
| —
| —
| —
|
|-
| style="text-align:left;"| "It Was You"b/w "Got to Cry" 
| —
| —
| —
| —
| —
| —
| —
| —
|
|-
| style="text-align:left;"| "Good Good Lovin'"b/w "Don't Let It Happen to Me" (from Try Me!)
| —
| —
| —
| —
| —
| —
| —
| —
|
| style="text-align:left;" rowspan="5"| Think!
|-
| rowspan="6" |1960
| style="text-align:left;"| "I'll Go Crazy"b/w "I Know It's True"
| —
| 15
| —
| —
| —
| —
| —
| —
|
|-
| style="text-align:left;"| "Think" /
| 33
| 7
| —
| —
| —
| —
| —
| —
|
|-
| style="text-align:left;"| "You've Got the Power"
| —
| 14
| —
| —
| —
| —
| —
| —
|
|-
| style="text-align:left;"| "This Old Heart"b/w "Wonder When You're Coming Home"
| 79
| 20
| —
| —
| —
| —
| —
| —
|
|-
| colspan="15" style="text-align:left;"| King releases:
|-
| style="text-align:left;"| "The Bells"b/w "And I Do Just What I Want"
| 68
| —
| —
| —
| —
| —
| —
| —
|
| style="text-align:left;"| The Amazing James Brown
|-
| rowspan="7" | 1961
| style="text-align:left;"| "Hold It"b/w "The Scratch" (from James Brown Presents His Band!/Mighty Instrumentals)
| —
| —
| —
| —
| —
| —
| —
| —
|
| style="text-align:left;"| James Brown Presents His Band/James Brown Plays James Brown Today & Yesterday
|-
| style="text-align:left;"| "Bewildered"b/w "If You Want Me"
| 40
| 8
| —
| —
| —
| —
| —
| —
|
| style="text-align:left;"| Think!
|-
| style="text-align:left;"| "I Don't Mind"b/w "Love Don't Love Nobody"
| 47
| 4
| —
| —
| —
| —
| —
| —
|
| style="text-align:left;"| The Amazing James Brown
|-
| style="text-align:left;"| "Suds"b/w "Sticky" (from Tour the U.S.A.)
| —
| —
| —
| —
| —
| —
| —
| —
|
| style="text-align:left;"| James Brown Presents His Band/Mighty Instrumentals
|-
| style="text-align:left;"| "Baby You're Right"b/w "I'll Never, Never Let You Go"
| 49
| 2
| —
| —
| —
| —
| —
| —
|
| style="text-align:left;"| Think!
|-
| style="text-align:left;"| "Just You and Me, Darling"b/w "I Love You, Yes I Do"
| —
| 17
| —
| —
| —
| —
| —
| —
|
| style="text-align:left;" rowspan="2"| The Amazing James Brown
|-
| style="text-align:left;"| "Lost Someone"b/w "Cross Firing" (from Tour the U.S.A.)
| 48
| 2
| —
| —
| —
| —
| —
| —
|
|-
| rowspan="4" | 1962
| style="text-align:left;"| "Night Train"b/w "Why Does Everything Happen to Me" (a.k.a. "Strange Things Happen", from Try Me!)
| 35
| 5
| —
| —
| —
| —
| —
| —
|`
| style="text-align:left;"| non-album track/later included on I Got You (I Feel Good)
|-
| style="text-align:left;"| "Shout and Shimmy"b/w "Come Over Here"
| 61
| 16
| —
| —
| —
| —
| —
| —
|
| style="text-align:left;"| Good, Good, Twistin' with James Brown
|-
| style="text-align:left;"| "Mashed Potatoes U.S.A."b/w "You Don't Have to Go" (from The Amazing James Brown)
| 82
| 21
| —
| —
| —
| —
| —
| —
|
| style="text-align:left;" rowspan="4"| James Brown and His Famous Flames Tour the U.S.A.
|-
| style="text-align:left;"| "Three Hearts in a Tangle"b/w "I've Got Money"
| 93
| 18
| —
| —
| —
| —
| —
| —
|
|-
| rowspan="6" | 1963
| style="text-align:left;"| "Like a Baby" /
| —
| 24
| —
| —
| —
| —
| —
| —
|
|-
| style="text-align:left;"| "Every Beat of My Heart"
| 99
| —
| —
| —
| —
| —
| —
| —
|
|-
| style="text-align:left;"| "Prisoner of Love"b/w "Choo Choo"
| 18
| 6
| —
| —
| —
| —
| —
| —
|
| style="text-align:left;"| Prisoner of Love
|-
| style="text-align:left;"| "These Foolish Things"b/w "(Can You) Feel It Part 1" (from Prisoner Of Love)
| 55
| 25
| —
| —
| —
| —
| —
| —
|
| style="text-align:left;" | non-album track (later re-recorded for Hell)
|-
| style="text-align:left;"| "Signed Sealed and Delivered"b/w "Waiting in Vain"
| 77
| —
| —
| —
| —
| —
| —
| —
|
| style="text-align:left;"| Prisoner of Love
|-
| style="text-align:left;"| "I've Got to Change"b/w "The Bells" (from The Amazing James Brown)
| —
| —
| —
| —
| —
| —
| —
| —
|
| style="text-align:left;"| Try Me!
|-
| rowspan="7" | 1964
| style="text-align:left;"| "Oh Baby Don't You Weep"—Part 1b/w Part 2
| 23
| —
| —
| —
| —
| —
| —
| —
|
| style="text-align:left;" | non-album track/Pure Dynamite! Live at the Royal
|-
| style="text-align:left;"| "Please, Please, Please" (overdubbed)b/w "In the Wee Wee Hours (Of the Nite)" (from Tour the U.S.A.)
| 95
| —
| —
| —
| —
| —
| —
| —
|
| style="text-align:left;"| Pure Dynamite! Live at the Royal
|-
| style="text-align:left;"| "Again"b/w "How Long Darling"
| —
| —
| —
| —
| —
| —
| —
| —
|
| style="text-align:left;" rowspan="2"|Prisoner of Love
|-
| style="text-align:left;"| "So Long"b/w "Dancin' Little Thing" (from The Amazing James Brown)
| —
| —
| —
| —
| —
| —
| —
| —
|
|-
| style="text-align:left;"| "Tell Me What You're Gonna Do"b/w "I Don't Care" (from Tour the U.S.A.)
| —
| —
| —
| —
| —
| —
| —
| —
|
| style="text-align:left;"|The Amazing James Brown
|-
| style="text-align:left;"| "Think"b/w "Try Me" (from Prisoner of Love)
| —
| —
| —
| —
| —
| —
| —
| —
|
| style="text-align:left;"|James Brown Live at the Apollo
|-
| style="text-align:left;"| "Have Mercy Baby"b/w "Just Won't Do Right"
| 92
| —
| —
| —
| —
| —
| —
| —
|
| style="text-align:left;"|Good Good Twistin' with James Brown
|-
| colspan="15" style="text-align:left;"| Smash releases:
|-
| rowspan="3" | 1964
| style="text-align:left;"| "Caldonia"b/w "Evil"
| 95
| —
| —
| —
| —
| —
| —
| —
|
| style="text-align:left;" rowspan="2"| Showtime
|-
| style="text-align:left;"| "The Things That I Used to Do"b/w "Out of the Blue"
| 99
| —
| —
| —
| —
| —
| —
| —
|
|-
| style="text-align:left;"| "Out of Sight"b/w "Maybe the Last Time"
| 24
| —
| —
| 23
| —
| —
| —
| —
|
| style="text-align:left;"| Out Of Sight
|-
|rowspan="2"| 1965
| style="text-align:left;"| "Who's Afraid of Virginia Woolf"b/w "Devil's Hideaway"James Brown at the Organ
| —
| —
| —
| —
| —
| —
| —
| —
|
|align="left"|Grits & Soul
|-
| style="text-align:left;"| "Try Me"b/w "Papa's Got a Brand New Bag"Instrumental versions: James Brown at the Organ
| 63
| 34
| —
| —
| —
| —
| —
| —
|
| style="text-align:left;"| James Brown Plays James Brown - Today & Yesterday
|-
| rowspan="3"|1966
| style="text-align:left;"| "New Breed" (Part I)b/w Part II
| —
| —
| —
| 99
| —
| —
| —
| —
|
| style="text-align:left;" rowspan="2"|James Brown Plays New Breed
|-
| style="text-align:left;"| "James Brown's Boo-Ga-Loo"b/w "Lost in a Mood of Changes"
| —
| —
| —
| —
| —
| —
| —
| —
|
|-
| style="text-align:left;"| "Let's Go Get Stoned"b/w "Our Day Will Come"
| —
| —
| —
| —
| —
| —
| —
| —
|
| style="text-align:left;"|Handful Of Soul
|-
| 1967
| style="text-align:left;"| "Jimmy Mack"b/w "What Do You Like"James Brown at the Organ
| —
| —
| —
| —
| —
| —
| —
| —
|
| style="text-align:left;"|James Brown Plays the Real Thing
|-
| colspan="15" style="text-align:left;"| King releases:
|-
| rowspan="5" | 1965
| style="text-align:left;"| "This Old Heart"b/w "It Was You" (from Try Me!)
| —
| —
| —
| —
| —
| —
| —
| —
|
| style="text-align:left;" |Think!
|-
| style="text-align:left;"| "Papa's Got a Brand New Bag"—Part 1b/w Part 2
| 8
| 1
| —
| 6
| —
| —
| 16
| 25
|
| style="text-align:left;"| non-album track/re-recorded for Soul on Top
|-
| style="text-align:left;"| "I Got You (I Feel Good)"b/w "I Can't Help It (I Just Do-Do-Do)"
| 3
| 1
| —
| 35
| —
| —
| —
| 29
|
| style="text-align:left;"| non-album track/I Got You (I Feel Good) (original version on Out of Sight)
|-
| style="text-align:left;"| "Lost Someone" (Live) /
| 94
| —
| —
| —
| —
| —
| —
| —
|
| style="text-align:left;" rowspan="2"| James Brown Live at the Apollo
|-
| style="text-align:left;"| "I'll Go Crazy" (Live)
| 73
| 28
| —
| —
| —
| —
| —
| —
|
|-
| rowspan="9" | 1966
| style="text-align:left;"| "Ain't That a Groove"—Parts 1 & 2
| 42
| 6
| —
| 46
| —
| —
| —
| 51
|
| style="text-align:left;" | It's a Man's Man's Man's World
|-
| style="text-align:left;"| "Come Over Here"b/w "Tell Me What You're Gonna Do" (from Good Good Twistin' with James Brown)
| —
| —
| —
| —
| —
| —
| —
| —
|
| style="text-align:left;"| The Amazing James Brown
|-
| style="text-align:left;"| "It's a Man's Man's Man's World"b/w "Is It Yes or Is It No?"
| 8
| 1
| 14
| 25
| —
| 33
| —
| 13
|
| style="text-align:left;"| non-album track/re-recorded for Soul on Top
|-
| style="text-align:left;"| "How Long Darling"b/w "This Old Heart" (from Think!)
| —
| —
| —
| —
| —
| —
| —
| —
|
| style="text-align:left;"|Prisoner of Love
|-
| style="text-align:left;"| "Money Won't Change You"—Part 1b/w Part 2
| 53
| 16
| —
| 52
| —
| —
| —
| —
|
| style="text-align:left;" rowspan="2"| James Brown Sings Raw Soul
|-
| style="text-align:left;"| "Don't Be a Drop-Out"b/w "Tell Me That You Love Me"
| 50
| 4
| —
| 35
| —
| —
| —
| —
|
|-
| style="text-align:left;"| "The Christmas Song"—Version 1b/w Version 2
| —
| —
| —
| —
| —
| —
| —
| —
|
| style="text-align:left;" rowspan="3"| James Brown Sings Christmas Songs
|-
| style="text-align:left;"| "Sweet Little Baby Boy"—Part 1b/w Part 2
| —
| —
| —
| —
| —
| —
| —
| —
|
|-
| style="text-align:left;"| "Let's Make This Christmas Mean Something This Year"—Part 1b/w Part 2
| —
| —
| —
| —
| —
| —
| —
| —
|
|-
| rowspan="11" | 1967
| style="text-align:left;"| "Bring It Up"b/w "Nobody Knows"
| 29
| 7
| —
| —
| —
| 47
| —
| —
|
| style="text-align:left;"| James Brown Sings Raw Soul
|-
| style="text-align:left;"| "Kansas City"b/w "Stone Fox" (from James Brown Sings Raw Soul)
| 55
| 21
| —
| —
| —
| —
| —
| —
|
| style="text-align:left;" rowspan="2"| Live at the Apollo, Volume II
|-
| style="text-align:left;"| "Think" (with Vicki Anderson)B-side by Vicki Anderson: "Nobody Cares"
| 100
| —
| —
| —
| —
| —
| —
| —
|
|-
| style="text-align:left;"| "Let Yourself Go"b/w "Good Rockin' Tonight" (from Cold Sweat)
| 46
| 5
| —
| —
| —
| —
| —
| —
|
| style="text-align:left;"| James Brown Sings Raw Soul
|-
| style="text-align:left;"| "I Loves You Porgy"b/w "Yours and Mine" (from James Brown Sings Raw Soul)
| —
| —
| —
| —
| —
| —
| —
| —
|
| style="text-align:left;" rowspan="3"| Cold Sweat
|-
| style="text-align:left;"| "Mona Lisa""It Won't Be Me" (from I Got the Feelin)
| —
| —
| —
| —
| —
| —
| —
| —
|
|-
| style="text-align:left;"| "Cold Sweat"—Part 1b/w Part 2
| 7
| 1
| —
| —
| —
| —
| —
| —
|
|-
| style="text-align:left;"| "Get It Together"—Part 1b/w Part 2
| 40
| 11
| —
| —
| —
| —
| —
| —
|
| style="text-align:left;" rowspan="5"| I Can't Stand Myself When You Touch Me
|-
| style="text-align:left;"| "The Soul of J.B."b/w "Funky Soul #1"
| —
| —
| —
| —
| —
| —
| —
| —
|
|-
| style="text-align:left;"| "I Can't Stand Myself (When You Touch Me)" /
| 28
| 4
| —
| —
| —
| —
| —
| —
|
|-
| style="text-align:left;"| "There Was a Time"
| 36
| 3
| —
| —
| —
| —
| —
| —
|
|-
| rowspan="8" | 1968
| style="text-align:left;"| "You've Got to Change Your Mind" (with Bobby Byrd)B-side by Bobby Byrd: "I'll Lose My Mind"
| —
| 47
| —
| —
| —
| —
| —
| —
|
|-
| style="text-align:left;"| "I Got the Feelin'"b/w "If I Ruled the World"
| 6
| 1
| —
| —
| —
| —
| —
| —
|
| style="text-align:left;"| I Got the Feelin'''
|-
| style="text-align:left;"| "Licking Stick – Licking Stick"—Part 1b/w Part 2
| 14
| 2
| —
| 31
| —
| —
| —
| —
|
| style="text-align:left;"| Say It Loud – I'm Black and I'm Proud|-
| style="text-align:left;"| "America Is My Home"—Part 1b/w Part 2
| 52
| 13
| —
| —
| —
| —
| —
| —
|
|align="left"|non-album tracks
|-
| style="text-align:left;"| "I Guess I'll Have to Cry, Cry, Cry"<small>b/w "Just Plain Funk" (from I Got the Feelin')</small>
| 55
| 15
| —
| 52
| —
| —
| —
| —
|
| style="text-align:left;" rowspan="3"| Say It Loud – I'm Black and I'm Proud|-
| style="text-align:left;"| "Say It Loud – I'm Black and I'm Proud"—Part 1b/w Part 2
| 10
| 1
| —
| 47
| —
| —
| —
| —
|
|-
| style="text-align:left;"| "Goodbye My Love"b/w "Shades of Brown"
| 31
| 9
| —
| 39
| —
| —
| —
| —
|
|-
| style="text-align:left;"| "Tit for Tat (Ain't No Taking Back)"b/w "Believers Shall Enjoy (Non-Believers Shall Suffer)"
| 86
| —
| —
| 58
| —
| —
| —
| —
|
| style="text-align:left;"| A Soulful Christmas|-
| rowspan="10" | 1969
| style="text-align:left;"| "Give It Up or Turnit a Loose"b/w "I'll Lose My Mind" (from Say It Loud – I'm Black and I'm Proud)
| 15
| 1
| —
| 45
| —
| —
| —
| —
|
| style="text-align:left;"| non-album track
released as an instrumental on Ain't It Funky
|-
| style="text-align:left;"| "Soul Pride"—Part 1b/w Part 2
| —
| 33
| —
| 100
| —
| —
| —
| —
|
| style="text-align:left;"| The Popcorn|-
| style="text-align:left;"| "I Don't Want Nobody to Give Me Nothing(Open Up the Door, I'll Get It Myself)"—Part 1b/w Part 2
| 20
| 3
| —
| 51
| —
| —
| —
| —
|
|align="left"|non-album tracks
|-
| style="text-align:left;"| "The Popcorn"b/w "The Chicken"
| 30
| 11
| —
| 46
| —
| —
| —
| —
|
| style="text-align:left;"| The Popcorn|-
| style="text-align:left;"| "Mother Popcorn (You've Got to Have a Mother for Me)"—Part 1b/w Part 2
| 11
| 1
| —
| 16
| —
| —
| —
| —
|
| style="text-align:left;"| It's a Mother|-
| style="text-align:left;"| "Lowdown Popcorn"b/w "Top of the Stack" (from It's A Mother)
| 41
| 16
| —
| 49
| —
| —
| —
| —
|
| style="text-align:left;"| Sex Machine|-
| style="text-align:left;"| "World"—Part 1b/w Part 2
| 37
| 8
| —
| 52
| —
| —
| —
| —
|
| style="text-align:left;" rowspan="3"| It's a New Day – Let a Man Come In|-
| style="text-align:left;"| "Let a Man Come In and Do the Popcorn"—Part 1b/w "Sometime" (from Super Bad)
| 21
| 2
| —
| 69
| —
| —
| —
| —
|
|-
| style="text-align:left;"| "Let a Man Come In and Do the Popcorn"—Part 2b/w "Gittin' a Little Hipper"—Part 2 (non-album track; instrumental version of "Get It Together")
| 40
| 6
| —
| 55
| —
| —
| —
| —
|
|-
| style="text-align:left;"| "Ain't It Funky Now"—Part 1b/w Part 2
| 24
| 3
| —
| 64
| —
| —
| —
| —
|
| style="text-align:left;"| Ain't It Funky|-
| rowspan="7" | 1970
| style="text-align:left;"| "It's a New Day"—Parts 1 & 2b/w "Georgia on My Mind"
| 32
| 3
| —
| 51
| 34
| 31
| 76
| —
|
| style="text-align:left;"| It's a New Day – Let a Man Come In|-
| style="text-align:left;"| "Funky Drummer"—Part 1b/w Part 2
| 51
| 20
| —
| 41
| —
| —
| —
| —
|
| style="text-align:left;"| non-album tracks
|-
| style="text-align:left;"| "Brother Rapp"—Parts 1 & 2b/w "Bewildered" (new version; non-album track)
| 32
| 2
| —
| 62
| —
| —
| 79
| —
|
| style="text-align:left;" |Slaughter's Big Rip-Off|-
| style="text-align:left;"| "Get Up (I Feel Like Being A) Sex Machine"—Part 1b/w Part 2
| 15
| 2
| 4
| —
| 29
| —
| 7
| 32
|
| style="text-align:left;"| non-album track
|-
| style="text-align:left;"| "Super Bad"—Parts 1 & 2b/w Part 3
| 13
| 1
| —
| —
| 48
| 56
| —
| —
|
| style="text-align:left;"| Super Bad|-
| style="text-align:left;"| "Santa Claus Is Definitely Here to Stay"b/w Instrumental Sing-Along version of A-side
| —
| —
| —
| —
| —
| —
| —
| —
|
| style="text-align:left;"| Hey America|-
| style="text-align:left;"| "Get Up, Get into It, Get Involved"—Part 1b/w Part 2
| 34
| 4
| —
| —
| —
| —
| —
| —
|
| style="text-align:left;"| non-album tracks
|-
| rowspan="3" | 1971
| style="text-align:left;"| "Spinning Wheel"—Part 1 (live)b/w Part 2 (live)
| 90
| 79
| 89
| 50
| 78
| 10
| 53
| 33
|
| style="text-align:left;"| Sex Machine|-
| style="text-align:left;"| "Soul Power"—Part 1b/w Parts 2 & 3
| 29
| 3
| 92
| 67
| 47
| —
| —
| 24
|
| style="text-align:left;" rowspan="2" | non-album tracks
|-
| style="text-align:left;"| "I Cried"b/w "World"(from It's A New Day - Let A Man Come In)—Part 2
| 50
| 15
| —
| —
| —
| —
| —
| —
|
|-
| colspan="15" style="font-size:90%"| "—" denotes items that did not chart or were not released in that territory.
Note: All singles from (1956) "Please, Please, Please" through to (1968) "I Guess I'll Have to Cry, Cry, Cry" credited as James Brown and The Famous Flames
|-
|}

1971–1981

1983–present

Billboard Year-End performances

Home video and film releases
 Hard Hits (1994; VHS only) 
 Live at The House of Blues (1999)
 James Brown: Soul Survivor (2004)
 Live in Montreux 1981 (2005)
 The Night James Brown Saved Boston (2008)
 I Got the Feelin': James Brown in the '60s (2008; 3-DVD set featuring The Night James Brown Saved Boston, Live at the Boston Garden 1968, and Live at the Apollo '68)
 Live at the Boston Garden: April 5, 1968'' (2009)

Other appearances

See also 
 The J.B.'s

Notes

References

External links 
 James Brown discography at Funky Stuff
 [ James Brown discography] at Allmusic
 James Brown discography at Discogs
 Complete James Brown UK singles discography at 45cat

Discography
Discographies of American artists
Pop music discographies
Rhythm and blues discographies
Rock music discographies
Funk music discographies